Speotarus lucifugus is a species of beetle in the family Carabidae, the only species in the genus Speotarus.

References

Lebiinae